The 1921–22 NCAA season was the second season of official NCAA sponsorship of team and individual national championships for college athletics in the United States, coinciding with the 1921–22 collegiate academic school year.

Only one sport was sponsored: men's track and field.

Before the introduction of the separate University Division and College Division before the 1955–56 school year, the NCAA only conduced a single national championship for each sport. Women's sports were not added until 1981–82.

Championships

Season results

Team titles, by university

Cumulative results

Team titles, by university

References

1921 in American sports
1922 in American sports